Gavino Matta (June 9, 1910 in Sassari – January 20, 1954) was an Italian boxer who competed in the 1936 Summer Olympics.

In 1936, Matta won the silver medal in the flyweight class after losing the final fight to Willy Kaiser, the German competitor. The American, Lou Laurie, won the bronze. In the final fight for the title, Kaiser attacked Matta from the outset, forcing the tempo at close quarters and keeping Matta at bay. When Matta tried to fight back Kaiser pushed the pace. Towards the end of the fight the Italian tired and Kaiser wrapped up a points decision and Germany's first ever boxing gold. The two men met again a year later in the European championship and Matta succeeded to defeat Kaiser, although this time it was for the bronze medal. Matta and Lauria later turned professional with Matta going on to become the Italian champion. In 1937 Europe's boxing champions, including Matta, competed against the Golden Gloves in international fights.

Olympic Record
Gavino Matta competed for Italy in the 1936 Berlin Olympics as a flyweight boxer.  Here is Matta's complete Olympic record:

 Round of 32: defeated Tinus Lambiliion (Netherlands) on points
 Round of 16: defeated Kaj Frederikson (Denmark) on points
 Quarterfinal: defeated Raoul Degryse (Belgium) on points
 Semifinal: defeated Louis Laurie (USA) on points
 Final: lost to Willy Kaiser (Germany) on points (awarded silver medal)

References
 profile

External links

1910 births
1954 deaths
People from Sassari
Flyweight boxers
Olympic boxers of Italy
Boxers at the 1936 Summer Olympics
Olympic silver medalists for Italy
Olympic medalists in boxing
Italian male boxers
Sportspeople from Sardinia
Medalists at the 1936 Summer Olympics